Donald Adair (born 1960) is an American former ice dancer. With Renée Roca, he is the 1986 U.S. national champion. An injury led to Adair's sudden retirement from competitive skating prior to the 1987 World Championships. He married Kelley Morris, the 1977 U.S. junior champion in ice dancing. They have coached at the Indiana Skating Academy in Indianapolis and the Louisville Skating Academy in Louisville, Kentucky.

Results
(with Roca)

References

1960 births
Living people
American male ice dancers